Established in 2000, BaCaTec for Bavaria California Technology Center is a technology platform for research exchange between universities in the federal states of Bavaria in Germany and the state of California in the United States of America.

Mission
The mission of BaCaTeC is to increase and promote cooperations between researchers, including academic and commercial efforts, located in Bavaria and California, by providing a data basis for the identification of potential partners and assists initial contacts. BaCaTeC also sponsors projects with seed money to start up new collaborations amongst the participants.

BaCaTeC strongly encourages the expansion and development of research projects by academic and/or commercial Bavarian and Californian institutions which have the potential to attract external funding in the future.

Areas of Study
Participants in active exchange between the universities are involved in the following areas of study:
life sciences
information and communication technologies
new materials 
environmental technologies and 
mechatronics

Status
As of July 2009, there have been 299 joint research projects, on which BaCatec spent about €1.6 million.

References

External links
Official Website (German/English)
Official Website (English)

Computing platforms
2000 introductions
Education in Bavaria
Education in California
Scientific societies based in Germany
Germany–United States relations